William Dennison Cary was the founder and namesake of Cary, Illinois, and one of its early prominent citizens.

He was born in 1808 in Sandy Creek, New York. In 1830 he married Lodemia Ells, who was one year older than he. Their first child, Cornelia, was born in 1832. Two years later, they welcomed another daughter, Hulda. In the next few years, five more children expanded their family to nine members. 

While William and Lodemia's family grew, he bought , in three separate purchases, thus creating the first section of Cary, Illinois. In 1845, he built on West Main Street a red brick house, which still stands today. However, the house was moved to a lot on East Ross Street in 1966, when Ameritech bought the West Main property. The present-day house includes two sections that were added later.

External links
 Village of Cary, and biography of William Dennison Cary

People from Cary, Illinois
1808 births
Year of death missing
People from Sandy Creek, New York